A wamus is a type of jacket worn in the United States. The term is applied to several different types of upper-body garment.

Early American history
One of the more consistent uses of wamus is to describe a fringed leather tunic that slips over the head. For early American pioneer families in the Southern United States, the buckskin (later, cloth) wamus was widely worn by young and pre-teen boys in the late 18th and very early 19th century. The wamus, if it opened down the front, was either laced shut or held closed with a belt, with dressier versions made from elk skin. If made from cloth, the wamus was dyed blue and trimmed with yellow fringe.

As worn by the Lakota people, the wamus was a ceremonial tunic which was coloured to represent the type of person the wearer was, as well as painted with mnemonic designs. Traditionally, if a warrior had scalped his enemy, he was allowed to trim his wamus with human hair cut from the heads of mourning women in addition to the cut fringe.

Later history
The wamus eventually came to describe a sleeved jacket or cardigan, typically with buttoned wristbands and a belt-like waistband, in which format, it was also sometimes called a roundabout.

For Sunday best and other special occasions Amish men wear a jacket called a wamus, distinct from the 'mutze' traditionally worn for preaching.

See also
 Zouave jacket

References

Jackets
19th-century fashion
20th-century fashion
American clothing
Native American clothing